Arnault may refer to:

 Antoine-Vincent Arnault (1766–1834), French dramatist and poet
 Bernard Arnault (born 1949), French businessman
 Delphine Arnault (born 1975), his daughter, a French businesswoman
 Jean Arnault (born 1951), French diplomat
 Jean-Claude Arnault (born 1946), French-Swedish photographer and convicted sex offender

See also

 Bois-Arnault

French-language surnames